Polish-Bohemian War can refer to::

Polish-Bohemian War (990)
Polish-Bohemian War (1038–1039)
Polish-Bohemian War (1345–1348)

See also
Polish–Czechoslovak War